Iminoboranes comprise a group of organoboron compounds with the formula RB=NR'. They are electronically related to acetylenes but are usually more reactive due to the polarity.

Structure and bonding 
The parent iminoborane, HB=NH, is produced by the photolysis of H3BNH3. Bonding in iminoboranes can be described by two resonance structures: 
R-\overset{\ominus}{B}{\equiv}\overset{\oplus}{N}-R <-> R-B=\ddot{N}-R

The stability is dramatically affected by bulky substituents. One isolable iminoborane is (tert-Bu)B=N(tert-Bu).

Synthesis

Elimination of fluoro- or chlorosilanes provides a well-tested route. Bulky substituents such as (Me3Si)3Si stabilize the iminoborane with respect to oligomerization:
(Me3Si)3SiB(F)-N(SiMe3)2  →  (Me3Si)3Si-B=N-SiMe3 +  F-SiMe3

Thermal decomposition of azidoboranes induces migration of R from boron to the nascent nitrene gives iminoboranes:
R2B-N3  →   RB=NR  + N2

Reactivity

Oligomerization 
Iminoboranes tend to oligomerize, often forming cyclic derivatives.  Preventing this reaction is the purpose of bulky substituents. Five types of oligomerization product are produced: cyclodimers (1,3,2,4-diazadiboretidines, Di), cyclotrimers (borazines, Tr), bicyclotrimers (Dewar borazines, Tr′), cyclotetramers (octahydro-1,3,5,7-tetraza-2,4,6,8-tetraborocines, Te), and polymers (polyiminoboranes, Po); which are shown below. Which product is dominant depends on the structures of reactants and the reaction conditions. Some of the products can be interconverted.

Addition reactions
The addition of protic agents is fast and quantitive. Boration reaction of iminoboranes is the addition of B-X single bond to B≡N, where -X can be -Cl (chloro-boration), -N3 (azido-boration), -SR (thio-boration), -NR2 (amino-boration) and R (alkyl-boration). One of these reactions are illustrated here. 

Some electron-rich iminoboranes form adducts with Lewis acids.

Cycloaddition
The typical [2+3]-cycloaddition is the addition of B≡N and RN3 to give a BN4 ring. One of the widely investigated [2+2]-cycloadditions is the reaction of aldehydes and ketones.

Coordination to transition metals 
Like alkynes, iminoboranes bind transition metals.

References 

Boranes
Amines
Boron–nitrogen compounds